The Institute of Engineering (IOE) (Nepali: ईन्जिनियरिङ अध्ययन संस्थान), established in 1930, is the first technical school of Nepal. It was reformed in the present shape in 1972 as an organ of Tribhuvan University. IOE runs professional diplomas, undergraduate, postgraduate and Ph.D. programs. The institute has four constituent and ten affiliated campuses in the country. It has five constituent campus namely Purwanchal Campus, Pashchimanchal Campus, Thapathali Campus, Pulchowk Campus and Chitwan Engineering Nepal

History 
The history of engineering education in Nepal can be traced to 1930, when a Technical Training School was established. The engineering section of the school offered only trades and civil sub-overseers programs. In 1959, the Nepal Engineering Institute, with the assistance of the government of India, started offering civil overseer courses leading to a Diploma in Civil Engineering. The Technical Training Institute established in 1965, with the assistance from the Government of Federal Republic of Germany, offered technician courses in general courses in General Mechanics, Auto Mechanics, Electrical Engineering and Mechanical Drafting.

In 1972, the Nepal Engineering Institute at Pulchowk and the Technical Training Institute at Thapathali were brought together under the umbrella of Tribhuvan University to constitute the Institute of Engineering. The Nepal Engineering Institute and the Technical Training Institute were renamed as Pulchowk campus and Thapathali Campus respectively.

The technician programs in Electrical, Electronics, Refrigeration/Air-conditioning Engineering were started at Pulchowk campus, with the assistance from UNDP/ILO. The Architecture Technician program was started by the IOE. With the assistance of the World Bank and UK, later, the existing technician level courses were strengthened and a bachelor's degree level course in Civil Engineering was started. Similarly, with the assistance of the World Bank, the Swiss government, and the Canadian government, Bachelor's degree level courses in Electronics, Electrical, Mechanical engineering and Architecture were started in the Pulchowk campus.

In 1998 IOE started a bachelor's degree program in Computer Engineering. In 1996, the Pulchowk campus, with support from the Norwegian government, started M.Sc. courses in Urban Planning, Structural Engineering, Environmental Engineering and Water Resources Engineering. Pulchok Campus started M.Sc. courses in Renewable Energy and Geothermal Engineering, Information and Communication and Power Systems Engineering effective from December 2001. The diploma level programs at the Pulchowk Campus have been transferred to other three IOE campuses.

The Pashchimanchal Campus in Pokhara of IOE became operational from 1987, with the assistance from the World Bank and UNDP/ILO. Initially trades and technician courses were offered. It offered diploma level courses in Civil, Electrical, Electronics, Automobile and Mechanical Engineering up to 2012. In 1999 a bachelor's degree program in Civil Engineering was started. Now it offers bachelor's degree in Civil, Mechanical, Electrical, Electronics & Communication, Computer, and Geomatics Engineering (started in 2012). Pashchimanchal Campus has also introduced Masters level in three different fields which are MSc in Infrastructure and Management, MSc in Electrical Distributed Generations and MSc in Communication and Knowledge.

The Thapathali Campus offers bachelor's degree programs in Civil Engineering, Industrial Engineering, Automobile Engineering, Mechanical Engineering, Electronics and Communication Engineering and in B.Architecture. It offered diploma level courses in Civil, Computer, Electronics and Communication, Mechanical and Automobile, and Architecture up to 2012.

The Purwanchal Campus in Dharan, which began operating from 1984, was built with the financial assistance from Asian Development Bank and technical assistance from the UK. This campus offered courses at the trade and technician levels. And it offered diploma level courses in the Civil, Electrical, Mechanical and Refrigeration/Air-conditioning Engineering up to 2012. In 2000 a bachelor's degree program in Agricultural Engineering was started. Now it offers bachelor's degree in Engineering (BE) in Civil, Electrical, Mechanical, Electronics & Communication, Computer, and Architecture (B.Arch).

Chitwan Engineering Campus was established in Rampur, Bharatpur in collaboration with Bharatpur Metropolitan City. The campus offers bachelor's course in Architecture at present.

Constituent campuses

Pulchowk Campus
Pulchowk Campus is the central campus of the Institute of Engineering in the heart of Lalitpur metropolitan city. This campus offers courses for undergraduate, graduate and Ph.D. degree programs. It offers bachelor's degree (B.E.) in civil engineering, mechanical engineering, aerospace engineering, computer engineering, electrical engineering, chemical engineering and electronics, communication and information engineering and bachelor's degree in architecture (B.Arch.).

Thapathali Campus
Thapathali Campus is a constituent campus in the heart of Kathmandu city. It is offering bachelor level courses in six engineering/architecture disciplines: Industrial engineering, Automobile engineering, Electronics and Communication engineering, Mechanical engineering, Civil engineering and Architecture and the 2015 intake in Mechanical engineering was halted but will continue to offer from 2016 on wards. All Diploma level programs have been phased out from Thapathali Campus. Industrial engineering is the oldest and the only engineering course that is available at this campus throughout Nepal.

Pashchimanchal Campus
Pashchimanchal Campus (aka Western Region Campus) lies in the northern part of  Pokhara, a beautiful city and tourist destination in western Nepal. The campus has stopped new admissions for further batches in diploma in engineering in all six disciplines, the last two academic years are running for this level. Bachelor level courses run in six engineering disciplines: Civil, Electronics and Communication, Mechanical, Electrical, Geomatics and Computer Engineering.

Purwanchal Campus
Purwanchal Campus (aka Eastern Region Campus) is in Dharan in the eastern region of the country. It offers bachelor level courses in six engineering/architecture disciplines: Agriculture, Electronics and Communication, Computer, Mechanical, Electrical, Civil engineering (B.E.) and Architecture (B.Arch). The campus offered diploma courses in six forms but the campus has stopped taking any new forms further. Previous batches are completing their courses.

Chitwan Engineering Campus
Chitwan Engineering Campus() is situated in Rampur of Chitwan district. At present, it offers bachelor level course in Architecture.

Centres
The Institute of Engineering has the following centres:

Centre for Applied Research and Development (CARD)
The Centre for Applied Research and Development (CARD) is an autonomous research and development centre within the IOE. The objective of the CARD is to carry out the primary mandate of the Institute of Engineering to educate students and to impart new knowledge by creating a research environment. CARD made an effort to establish a research culture and develop leadership at the IOE. It supports all kinds of scholarly activities: fundamental research, applied research and development contract research in government, non-government and international agencies. It capitalizes on the wide range of multidisciplinary in house expertise and capabilities of the IOE.

Centre for Energy Studies (CES)
The Centre for Energy Studies (CES) was established on 21 January 1999 by the Executive Council of TU on the strong recommendation of the international conference held in Kathmandu on "the Role of Renewable Energy Technologies for Rural Development" in October 1998. The objective of the center is promote and develop renewable energy technologies through study, research, human resource development and information dissemination for sustainable development.

CES has provided assistance to run courses on Master of Science in Renewable Energy Engineering (MSREE) and Master of Science in Technology and Innovation Management (TIM). "Zero Energy House (ZEH)" and Energy Park (EP) are established in the premises of Pulchowk Campus, which was also the first zero-energy building in the Asia. ZEH and EP are being used as living laboratories for research students and demonstration sites for all concerned in the application and development of renewable energy technologies.

Consultancy Services (IECS)
The Institute of Engineering has established a unit for rendering consultancy services in multidisciplinary engineering areas. The unit provides services in project development, design, supervision, quality control, monitoring and evaluation of projects, conservation works. The IECS generally handles consultancy of multidisciplinary nature. The chief of IECS makes an arrangement for providing consultancy services to the clients.

Besides, the central unit of IECS, IOE has consultancy units in Thapathali, Purwanchal and Paschimanchal campuses.

Continuing Education Division (CED)
The Continuing Education Division (CED) is a unit within the IOE. The objective of this unit is to provide short-term training courses. This division has conducted training programs on computer, GIS (in association with GIS society), Engineering applications (in association with IITs, universities from USA and Canada). The Continuing Education Division conducts training programs open to the public.

Curriculum Implementation and Material Development Unit (CIMDU)
The objective of this unit is to help the institute departments with academic training and seminars. The unit co-ordinate the activities concerning development of courses and lab manuals by IOE faculty. The unit assists in the curriculum reform process of the Diploma, Bachelor and Master level.

Centre of Pollution Studies (CPS)
The Centre of Pollution Studies (CPS) is an autonomous center. The center conducts and manages study/research regarding pollution.

Centre for Disaster Studies (CDS)
The Centre for Disaster Studies was established in 2003. Nepal loses life and property as a result of natural disaster every year. The major natural disasters are landslide and flood. The centre works for the management of disaster in the country. It does this by offering short courses, carrying out research and consultancy works in the beginning. The center assists Master's level courses in Disaster Risk Management in the IoE.

Centre for Information Technology (CIT)
The Centre for Information Technology (CIT) is a unit within the Institute of Engineering (IOE). CIT provides Information Technology facilities to the faculty, staff and students of the IOE. It has its own VSAT terminal, optical fiber backbone for internet connectivity and computing facilities within Pulchowk campus premises. CIT provides internet access to faculties, staff of TU and the students of IOE at a reasonable rate.

Industry Liaison Council (ILC)
The unit looks after industrial relations for connecting academia to industry. This unit explores the market condition for IOE graduates. The engineering human resource demand of the industries is worked out by the council. It also suggests necessary revisions in the courses.

Admission

Entrance examinations 
Entrance examinations are conducted by Tribhuvan University, Institute of Engineering yearly for freshmen, undergraduate and postgraduate intake. The entrance exam for the undergraduate intake is tough and more than 15,000 students from all over Nepal vie for to secure seats. Getting into Pulchowk Engineering college is the toughest, as the higher ranked students are more likely to choose it. It only takes about 432 students, from about 15,000 candidates, which roughly estimates the acceptance rate to be 2.67℅. The lower ranked students in the pool are likely to choose other affiliated colleges or universities. Getting into Pulchowk Engineering College is by far the toughest engineering entrance in the country.

Reservation policy 
10% reserved for female and 1 seat is available for TU staff

Programs

Diploma program 
This will be handed over to the Centre for Technical Education and Vocational Training.

Undergraduate program 
For BE/B.Arch, previously IOE took entrance exam in two parts.

 The first part is computer based. If you fail the first exam, you are disqualified for the second exam. In the first exam negative marking is done by 25%.
 The second exam is paper based.

In 2015, it was decided by Institute of Engineering, IOE that the exam will take place in a single part and the exams will totally be taken in computer and will carry 140 marks with 100 questions and no negative marking.

 B.Arch (Architecture)
 B.E (Civil Engineering)
 B.E (Electrical Engineering)
 B.E (Electronics & Communication Engineering)
 B.E (Mechanical Engineering)
 B.E (Aerospace Engineering)
 B.E (Computer Engineering)
 B.E (Agriculture Engineering)
 B.E (Industrial Engineering)
 B.E (Geomatics Engineering)
 B.E (Automobile Engineering)
 B.E (Chemical Engineering)

In Pulchowk Campus, Lalitpur the following programs are available:
 B.Arch (Architecture)
 B.E (Civil Engineering)
 B.E (Electrical Engineering)
 B.E (Electronics & Communication Engineering)
 B.E (Mechanical Engineering)
 B.E (Aerospace Engineering)
 B.E (Computer Engineering)
 B.E (Chemical Engineering)

In Pashchimanchal Campus, Pokhara the following programs are available:
 B.E (Civil Engineering)
 B.E (Electrical Engineering)
 B.E (Electronics & Communication Engineering)
 B.E (Mechanical Engineering)
 B.E (Computer Engineering)
 B.E (Geomatics Engineering)

In Purwanchal Campus, Dharan the following programs are available:
 B.E (Civil Engineering)
 B.E (Electronics & Communication Engineering)
 B.E (Mechanical Engineering)
 B.E (Computer Engineering)
 B.E (Agriculture Engineering)
 B.Arch (Architecture)
 B.E (Electrical Engineering) 

In Thapathali Campus the following programs are available:
 B.E (Industrial Engineering)
 B.E (Automobile Engineering)
 B.E (Civil Engineering)
 B.E (Electronics & Communication Engineering)
 B.E (Mechanical Engineering)
 B.Arch (Architecture)

The following programs have been proposed, and under development to be launched in the near future:
 B.E (Chemical Engineering)

Postgraduate and doctoral program

Master degree courses are running only in central campus Pulchowk as follows

Master of Science in Technology and Innovation Management (MSTIM) 
The Institute of Engineering (IOE) has been running a full-time, two-year (four semesters) Master program in Technology and Innovation Management (TIM) since July 2010 in collaboration with the Norwegian University of Science and Technology. This program consists of a package of courses covering areas for managing and mapping technology and innovation management and entrepreneurship. Graduates will be able to work for firms in the knowledge economy either as entrepreneurs starting new companies or as entrepreneurs generating and managing business opportunities in corporations.

Ph.D. Research:

Ph.D. Research is undergoing in all departments (civil engineering, mechanical engineering, electronics & computer engineering, electrical engineering, architecture & urban planning and science & humanities) in Central Campus Pulchowk.

Graduate Program at Thapathali Campus:

Starting at 2015, Thapathali Campus started its first graduate program in Earthquake Engineering (MSc in Earthquake Engineering). The program is run under department of civil engineering in Thapathali campus. The program follows a similar academic calendar to the graduate programs at Pulchowk campus. Similarly, the department of Automobile and Mechanical Engineering has proposed a master's degree in  Production Management, starting from 2017.

See also 

 Pulchowk Campus, Lalitpur
 Pashchimanchal Campus, WRC, Pokhara
 Thapathali Campus, Kathmandu
 Purwanchal Campus, ERC

The other technical institutes at TU are:
 Institute of Agriculture and Animal Science
 Institute of Forestry
 Institute of Medicine
 Institute of Science and Technology

References

Lalitpur District, Nepal
Engineering universities and colleges in Nepal
Tribhuvan University
Science and technology in Nepal
1972 establishments in Nepal